A ti te quería encontrar is a 2018 Mexican romantic comedy film directed by Javier Colinas and written by Tamara Argamasilla. The film stars Eréndira Ibarra, Erick Elias, Luis Arrieta, and Paulette Hernández. It premiered on 9 June 2018 on the 10th anniversary of the HOLA Mexico Film Festival in Los Angeles.

References

External links 
 

2018 films
Mexican romantic comedy films
2010s Spanish-language films
2018 romantic comedy films
2010s Mexican films